is a passenger railway station in the town of Yorii, Saitama, Japan, operated by the private railway operator Tōbu Railway.

Lines
There are no direct trains to or from Ikebukuro.

Station layout
The station consists of one side platform serving a single bidirectional track.

Adjacent stations

History

The station opened on 1 April 1934.

From 17 March 2012, station numbering was introduced on the Tōbu Tōjō Line, with Tamayodo Station becoming "TJ-37".

Passenger statistics
In fiscal 2019, the station was used by an average of 591 passengers daily.

Surrounding area
 Arakawa River

See also
 List of railway stations in Japan

References

External links

 Tobu station information 

Railway stations in Saitama Prefecture
Railway stations in Japan opened in 1934
Stations of Tobu Railway
Tobu Tojo Main Line
Yorii, Saitama